The Humanitarian Futures Programme (HFP) was originally initiated at King’s College, London, as an action research programme based within the School of Social Science and Public Policy at King's College London and over a decade worked with a wide range of social and natural scientists, representatives of governments, international and non-governmental organisations, as well as the private and humanitarian sectors. Its purpose was to identify future humanitarian challenges and solutions.

This mission continues as Humanitarian Futures (HF), providing futures-oriented discussion papers and emerging perspectives when it comes to dealing with ever more complex humanitarian crises.

It attempts to help organisations with humanitarian responsibilities to prepare for future humanitarian threats. HF believes that these threats will be more complex and unpredictable than those of today, and that their impacts will be of an exponentially different order. The Humanitarian and Development Partnership Team (HDPT), 24 May 2007, accessed 9 April 2009. HF also focuses upon solutions with a view to helping such organisations strengthen their prevention, preparedness and response capacities. These potential solutions come from a range of sources – including the natural and social sciences, the corporate sector and the military.

HF has developed a series of tools, methods and approaches to assess humanitarian organisations' futures capacities and the potential ways to strengthen them. In addition to its partner organisations, these resources have been created with the intention of aiding the wider humanitarian community in planning for the future.

The programme director is Dr. Randolph Kent, a former UN Humanitarian Coordinator in Somalia and several other East African crisis zones.

Programme Areas 

HF has four main programme areas designed to help organisations with humanitarian responsibilities prepare for the future.

Programme Area 1: Diverse actors, diverse engagement 

Capacity is the central challenge for dealing with the types, dimensions and dynamics of future humanitarian crises: capacity to innovate, capacity to strengthen operational impact, capacity to anticipate potential threats and solutions. Knowing how to engage in a systematic, sustained and strategic way with a range of diverse "non-traditional humanitarian" actors is key to providing such essential futures capacities.

Programme Area 2: Planning from the future - New approaches, new ways of working 

For organisations with humanitarian roles and responsibilities, the challenges of the 21st century will require them to be far more anticipatory and adaptive than the vast majority are today. They will need to adopt different perspectives on collaboration, and will have to appreciate the importance of prioritising innovation and innovative practices. They, too, will have to provide an enabling environment for strategic leadership, for without that even the most compelling visions will remain constrained by rigid organisational structures, processes and behaviours.

Programme Area 3: Future vulnerabilities - New risks, new solutions 

For organisations that have to deal with complexity, ambiguity and uncertainty, the art of speculation, of dealing with the what might be's, is essential. It provides means for them to look at how they seek information and understanding; and, in so doing, opens up opportunities for those same organisations to evaluate the sorts of networks and collaborating partners they should be engaging with and the sorts of innovations and innovative practices they should be assessing in order to prepare for the future.

Programme Area 4: Resources, tools and methodologies 

Organisations need means to test their capacities for dealing with the challenges of the future and also need measures to embark upon preparing for the future in ways that capture the essence of change as well as ways to foster and implement it. Such means and measures have to be flexible in order to adapt to the different requirements of organisations of different sizes, resources and objectives.

Assessment frameworks and organisational self-assessment tool 

HF tries to develop assessment frameworks for determining the anticipatory and adaptive capacities of humanitarian organisations. The overall assessment framework is designed for outside analysts and peer group reviews to assess individual organisations' capacities for dealing strategically with future threats and mitigation opportunities.

One instrument is the Organisational Self Assessment Tool (OSAT), a questionnaire which asks respondents to give their personal views on future humanitarian threats, the organisation's ability to anticipate future threats, to adapt to them, to innovate and to collaborate with new types of organisations.

Outputs and reports 
 "Dimensions of Crisis: humanitarian needs by 2015", HFP, Humanitarian Futures Programme, 17 January 2007.

External links 
 Humanitarian Futures Programme.

Research institutes in London
Humanitarian aid